"In the House" is a song performed by American contemporary Christian music singer Crowder, released on August 27, 2021, as the second single from his fourth studio album, Milk & Honey (2021). Crowder co-wrote the song with Jeff Sojka and Ben Glover.

"In the House" peaked at No. 1 on the US Hot Christian Songs chart. The song also went on to peak at No. 19 on the Bubbling Under Hot 100 chart.

Background
Crowder released "In the House" as the second single from Milk & Honey (2021), following the hit lead single of the album "Good God Almighty" which became his first No. 1 single on the Hot Christian Songs chart. Crowder shared the story behind the song, saying:

Composition

Commercial performance
Following the release of Milk & Honey, "In the House" debuted at No. 49 on the US Hot Christian Songs chart dated June 26, 2021. After the song's release as a single, "In the House" debuted on at No. 40 on the Christian Airplay chart dated September 4, 2021. "In the House" reached No. 1 on the Hot Christian Songs chart dated March 12, 2022. "In the House" also peaked at No. 1 on the Christian Airplay chart dated February 26, 2022.

Music video
On June 11, 2021, Crowder released the official lyric video for "In the House" on YouTube. Crowder published the official music video of the song via YouTube on November 10, 2021.

Track listing

Personnel
Adapted from AllMusic.
 Adam Ayan – mastering engineer
 Dallan Beck – editing
 Jesse Brock – mixing assistant
 Crowder – primary artist
 Warren David – mixing assistant
 Alex Dobbert – mastering engineer
 Ben Glover – acoustic guitar, background vocals, banjo, Dobro, editing, electric guitar, engineer, keyboards, producer, programmer
 Jerry McPherson – electric guitar
 Sean Moffitt – mixing
 Jeff Sojka – editing, electric guitar, engineer, keyboards, mixing, producer, programmer
 Doug Weier – mixing

Charts

Weekly charts

Year-end charts

Release history

References

External links
 
 

2021 singles
2021 songs
Crowder (musician) songs
Sparrow Records singles
Songs written by Ben Glover